Cottlesville is a rural community just outside Summerford on New World Island, Newfoundland and Labrador.

Demographics 

References

Populated coastal places in Canada
Towns in Newfoundland and Labrador